Sir Ewen Cameron of Lochiel (Scottish Gaelic: Eòghain Camshròn Mac Dhòmhnaill Dubh; February 1629 – 12 June 1719) was a Scottish highland chief, soldier and courtier. He was Chief of Clan Cameron – the 17th Lochiel, and was renowned for his role in the Wars of the Three Kingdoms (1650–1654) as a Cavalier and in the 1689 Jacobite Rebellion. 

Lord Macaulay described Sir Ewen as the 'Ulysses of the Highlands", being a man of enormous strength and size; indeed, he is regarded as one of the most formidable Scottish chiefs of all time. An incident showing his strength and ferocity in single combat, when he bit out the throat of an enemy is used by Sir Walter Scott in Lady of the Lake (canto v.). In 1680 he was said to have killed the last wolf in Scotland.

Early years 
Ewen Cameron of Lochiel was born in 1629 at Kilchurn Castle, the eldest son of John Cameron and Margaret Campbell of Glenorchy. He was the grandson of Allan Cameron of Lochiel, 16th Chief (c. 1567 – 1647) who had fought under Lord Montrose, and was present at the Battle of Inverlochy in 1645.

His father having predeceased him, Lochiel was initially raised by his Cameron uncle and then spent much of his youth under the guardianship of the 1st Marquess of Argyll at Inveraray. In 1647 he succeeded his grandfather as the Lochiel (Chief) of the Camerons, being one of the most important Highland clans.

Appearance 
Simon Fraser, Lord Lovat claimed that Lochiel bore a striking resemblance to Louis XIV of France, stating that "the resemblance was nearer than commonly that between two brothers; with this difference, that Sir Ewen was of a darker complexion, more brawny, and of  a larger size". He was often described as having "Spanish countenance", with "flashing eyes and a moustache curled as the moon horns". His Gaelic name was Eòghain Dubh (Black Ewan).

The Protectorate 
The Camerons were always strong supporters of the Royal Stuarts and despite being tutored by Argyll, Lochiel developed Cavalier sympathies after meeting with Sir Robert Spottiswood, and upon witnessing the brutal execution of royalist prisoners. Lochiel, like many others, was also greatly inspired by James Graham, Marquis of Montrose. 

When Lochiel became chief he joined William Cunningham, 9th Earl of Glencairn in the Royalist rising of 1651 to 1654. He fought at the Battle of Tullich in 1652, holding the pass against the forces of Robert Lilburne. He was commended by King Charles personally for his actions at Tullich and hailed as the "Deliverer of the Highland army". Lochiel also won several skirmishes during this period as well, gaining notoriety for harassing the Parliamentarian army led by George Monck in a form of guerrilla warfare across Scotland.  

A famous fight between Lochiel and a roundhead occurred during this period. He had encountered a group of English soldiers gathering firewood by Loch Eil, deep into Cameron territory, and in the ensuing fight Lochiel grappled with a English officer who threw him onto his back, pinned to the ground and defenceless before he managed to catch the Englishman’s throat in his teeth, not letting go until he had torn out his windpipe for the 'sweetest bite ever he had'.

Lochiel built a new base at Achnacarry Castle in 1655, to keep his men further away from the government troops. It was only upon the death of Oliver Cromwell in 1658 that he did submit to general Monck and was received for his chivalrous conduct during the Civil War. Soon after he accompanied Monck to London where the General called a meeting of Parliament to discuss the new status quo. After lengthy discussion and debate it was decided that the King would be invited back from exile and that the Royal House of Stuart would be restored to the throne after a Republican Interregnum of 12 years. For his loyal service during the Civil War, the Lochiel was received warmly by King Charles II and later returned to Lochaber for a period of peace.

Restoration and Highland feuds 
On 20 September 1665, Lochiel ended the 360-year feud with Clan MacIntosh after the stand-off at the Fords of Arkaig near Achnacarry. From that point, Ewen Cameron was responsible for keeping the peace between his clansmen and their former enemies. However in 1668, whilst he was away at the Royal court, a feud broke out between Clan Donald and hostile elements of Clan MacIntosh, who headed the confederation of clans known as Clan Chattan. Lochiel’s clansmen made a significant contribution to the MacDonald victory against the MacIntosh’ at the Battle of Maol Ruadh (Mulroy), often considered to be the last clan battle.

In another dispute, Lochiel was on his way to talk to Lord Atholl about a border between Lochaber and Perthshire when he met the witch Gormshuil Mhòr na Maighe. She had been married to a Cameron and was known for her supernatural powers and beauty. At first he ignored Gormshuil but she eventually seduced him, and persuaded him to return home to get his men. He should take them with him and keep them hidden and if he needed them he was to turn his coat inside out. Lochiel took her advice and although Lord Atholl too had men lying in wait, he was able to defeat and kill them. This dispute between Lochiel and Atholl led to the Cameron clan's motto 'Sons of the hounds, come here and get flesh.' It is also said that the motto came from the tune Lochiel's piper was playing at the time, "Thigibh an seo, chlanna nan con, is gheibh sibh feoil". (Come hither, sons of the hounds, and you'll get flesh!)

Lochiel's famous exploits were often recited by his Gaelic bards at his new seat of Achnacarry. One such bard described Achnacarry as "the generous house of feasting, pillared hall of princes, where wine goes round freely in gleaming glasses, music resounding under its rafters". 

From the late 1660s Lochiel served at the court of King Charles and was received well, if perhaps somewhat suspiciously at Whitehall. During this period, Lochiel became an acquaintance and friend of James, Duke of York (later James VII and II), by whose hand he would later be knighted. 

In 1681, Lochiel was knighted by James, Duke of York. According to Balhaldie, after complimenting him on the successful outcome of his feud with Macintosh, he asked for Lochiel's sword, and attempted to draw it unsuccessfully, the Duke, after a second attempt, gave it back to Lochiel and said 'that his sword never used to be so uneasy to draw when the crown wanted his services'. Lochiel unsheathed the sword and offered it to the Duke who thereupon knighted him.

Jacobite period 
 
The Glorious Revolution was a disaster for Lochiel and the Camerons. In 1688, the Stuart King James II was overthrown by William of Orange (In 1714 the Stuarts were then replaced by the Hanoverians). Lochiel, as a fervent Stuart loyalist, became one of the principal commanders in the Jacobite rising of 1689 having managed to rally a confederation of clans loyal to James. 
 

Lochiel fought with John Graham of Claverhouse, Viscount Dundee at the Battle of Killiecrankie – a stunning victory marred by Claverhouse’s death. After this the Jacobite rebellion soon collapsed because of arguments among the remaining leaders, largely due to the inept leadership of Alexander Cannon. By this time Sir Ewen, nearly sixty years old, had started to give his son, John Cameron, Master of Lochiel, greater responsibilities. 

Sir Ewen felt he was now too old to be able to participate physically in military action, thus designated his son and successor John Cameron to lead the clan in battle. Sir Ewen was notably absent in the second Jacobite rising of 1715 and the Jacobite rising of 1719. 

In 1717 John Cameron was made the 1st Lord Lochiel in the Jacobite peerage by Prince James as recognition of Cameron loyalty to the Jacobite cause.

Marriage and children
Sir Ewen married three times and had many children. His first wife was Mary Macdonald (died without issue), his second wife was Isobel MacLean, daughter of Sir Lachlan MacLean of Duart, and his final wife was Franco-Scottish Jean Barclay, daughter of David Barclay and Katherine Petau de Maulette. 

Notable issue:
Sir John Cameron, 1st Lord Lochiel (1663–1747), succeeded his father in 1719 becoming the 18th Chief. He was the father of Sir Donald Cameron 'the Gentle Lochiel'.
Major Donald Cameron of Clunes (died 1719), officer of the Dutch service who had fought against his father at Killiecrankie 
Allan Cameron (died 1730), a Jacobite agent and courtier of James Francis Edward Stuart
Ludovic Cameron of Tor (died 1753), a Jacobite officer who fought alongside his nephew during the 1745 rising
Lady Margaret Cameron, married Alexander MacGregor Drummond of Balhaldie 
Lady Anne Cameron, married Allan MacLean, 10th of Ardgour
Lady Janet Cameron (died 1759), married John Grant, 6th of Glenmoriston
Lady Christian Cameron, married Allan Cameron of Glendessary, mother of famed Jean Cameron of Glendessary
Lady Jean Cameron, married Ewen MacPherson, Chief of Clan MacPherson, father of Cluny MacPherson
Lady Katherine Cameron, married to John Campbell of Achalader
Lady Lucia Cameron, married Patrick Campbell of Barcaldine
Lady Marjory Cameron, married Allan MacDonald of Morar
Lady Una Cameron, married her cousin Robert Barclay of Ury (1732–1797)

Death
Sir Ewen died of natural causes at the age of ninety after the Battle of Glen Shiel in 1719. He was buried with great ceremony at an ancient burial ground on the shores of Loch Eil. It was reported that thousands of Gaels and thirteen pipers gathered to his funeral.

His son, John Cameron, 1st Lord Lochiel, had fought at Glen Shiel and succeeded him as Chief but was exiled after the Jacobite Rising of 1715 and forced to flee to the French court.

Lord Lochiel's son, Donald Cameron otherwise known as The Gentle Lochiel, became acting chief in absence of his father. The Gentle Lochiel would join Prince Charles Edward Stuart in 1745 and was wounded at the Battle of Culloden before escaping to France.

In literature 

 The Lady of the Lake (canto v.), by Sir Walter Scott models the legendary fight of Lochiel and the roundhead for the fight scene between Roderick Dubh and FitzJames.
 Tales of a Grandfather, by Sir Walter Scott reproduced the apparent senility of Lochiel who 'outlived himself, becoming a second child and even rocked in a cradle' according to Thomas Pennant, juxtaposing this state with the great warrior of his youth.
 The Grameid, an epic poem in Latin on the Claverhouse campaign of 1689 features Lochiel, written by James Philip of Almerieclos.
 The Jacobite Trilogy, a series of historical novels by D.K. Broster which focuses on the Cameron role in the 1745 rising.

See also
 Clan Cameron
 Jacobitism
Gormshuil Mhòr na Maighe
Battle of Killiecrankie

References

Notes

  Modern reprint of November 1883 article with a detailed account of Sir Ewen's life from 1654 to 1665.

Further reading
Memoirs of Sir Ewen Cameron of Locheill, by John Drummond of Balhaldie (Bannatyne Club, 1842)

External links
 www.jacobitestudiestrust.org

1629 births
1719 deaths
Scottish Jacobites
Scottish soldiers
Scottish politicians
Knights Bachelor
Scottish clan chiefs
Ewen
People of the Jacobite rising of 1689